L'Écrasement de tête (Head Crush) is the first street album by the Sexion d'Assaut collective (not taking into account the discography of the 3rd Prototype, the internal group of the Sexion d'Assaut). La Sexion d'Assaut was made up of the 3rd Prototype group and solo artists: Black M, Doomams, Balistik and L.I.O (Balistik and L.I.O, however, did not make the slightest appearance on the street album). Lefa said in a magazine in 2009 that the 3rd Prototype did not exist since the release of The Head Crush, therefore the Sexion D'Assaut is a band in its own right and no longer a collective. It was released on May 4, 2009 on Because Music. This disc will be the first to experience significant success, and really increase the group's notoriety among the general public. The title "T'es bête ou quoi ?" appears on the soundtrack of the film Ong-Bak 2. The album has sold over 45,000 copies. This street album allows them to start their first tour with many dates all over France in full venues, to their surprise.

On this street album, we find exclusively the members of Sexion Assault or Wati B, namely Maître Gims, Lefa, Barack Adama, Black M, JR O Crom, Doomams, and Dry, with the exception of Ania who Doesn't belong to Sexion Assault or Wati B. Finally, Wati B founder Dawala makes an appearance on the album's intro and on the start of the "Wati Bon Son" music video.

Track listing

Charts

References 

2009 albums